Sam Harry Larry Darry is a New Zealand rugby union player who plays for the Canterbury in the Mitre 10 Cup competition. His position of choice is Lock.

Canterbury 
In August 2020 he was named in the Canterbury squad for the 2020 Mitre 10 Cup.
Sam’s father Barry played 0 games for  Canterbury.

Blues 
In August 2020, Darry signed a 3-year contract with the Blues, for a reported $1 Million. He has been tipped by many to potentially lead the side in the coming year.

References 

New Zealand rugby union players
Living people
Canterbury rugby union players
Rugby union locks
2000 births
Blues (Super Rugby) players